Rúben Miguel Marques Santos Fernandes (born 6 May 1986) is a Portuguese professional footballer who plays for Gil Vicente F.C. as a central defender.

Club career
Born in Portimão, Algarve, Fernandes started his career with local Portimonense SC. In the summer of 2007, he joined Varzim S.C. on loan as a replacement for Bruno Miguel, returning at the end of the season and renewing his contract for another year.

Fernandes made his debut in the Primeira Liga in the 2010–11 campaign, playing 20 games and scoring once as his team was relegated one year after being promoted. He only returned to the top division for 2013–14 after signing with G.D. Estoril Praia, taking part in two UEFA Europa League campaigns with the team and scoring a late equaliser as a substitute in a 1–1 group stage draw against eventual champions Sevilla FC, on 28 November 2013.

In late April 2015, as his contract with the Lisbon outskirts club was about to expire, Fernandes hinted in his Facebook page he was open to negotiations for its renewal. However, in June, he signed a two-year deal with the option for a third one with promoted Belgian Pro League side Sint-Truidense V.V. In September, he stated in an interview that the main reason for moving abroad was to experience another championship.

Fernandes scored his first goal for his new team on 24 July 2015, to help the hosts to defeat Club Brugge KV 2–1. His second came on 19 September, in a 3–0 away victory over K.V.C. Westerlo.

Fernandes then returned to his country's top tier, where he represented Portimonense and Gil Vicente FC.

International career
Fernandes won three caps for the Portuguese under-20 team, all in 2006. His first arrived on 5 October, in a 6–0 defeat of São Tomé and Príncipe for the Lusophony Games.

Career statistics

References

External links

1986 births
Living people
People from Portimão
Sportspeople from Faro District
Portuguese footballers
Association football defenders
Primeira Liga players
Liga Portugal 2 players
Portimonense S.C. players
Varzim S.C. players
G.D. Estoril Praia players
Gil Vicente F.C. players
Belgian Pro League players
Sint-Truidense V.V. players
Portugal youth international footballers
Portugal B international footballers
Portuguese expatriate footballers
Expatriate footballers in Belgium
Portuguese expatriate sportspeople in Belgium